Second Baptist Church is a historic church located at 816 3rd Street NW in the Mount Vernon Triangle neighborhood of Washington, D.C. The congregation is a member of the District of Columbia Baptist Convention.

It was built in 1894 and designed by Appleton P. Clark, Jr.  It was added to the National Register of Historic Places in 2004.

References

External links

Churches completed in 1894
19th-century Baptist churches in the United States
Baptist churches in Washington, D.C.
Gothic Revival church buildings in Washington, D.C.
Churches on the National Register of Historic Places in Washington, D.C.